Abdelmajid Najib Ammari (born 10 April 1992) is an Algerian footballer who plays as a midfielder.

Club career
In June 2012, Ammari signed his first professional contract with Olympique Marseille. He joined leading Bulgarian club Levski Sofia for a period of two years in September 2014.

On 23 January 2021, he joined Italian Serie C club Viterbese.

International career
In 2009, Ammari was a member of the Algeria national under-17 football team at the 2009 FIFA U-17 World Cup in Nigeria. He played in all three of Algeria's matches in the group stage.

References

External links
 
 Profile at LevskiSofia.info

1992 births
Living people
Algerian footballers
Algeria youth international footballers
PFC Chernomorets Burgas players
CFR Cluj players
PFC Levski Sofia players
Latina Calcio 1932 players
Virtus Entella players
Spezia Calcio players
FC Dunărea Călărași players
FC Viitorul Constanța players
Damac FC players
U.S. Viterbese 1908 players
Liga I players
First Professional Football League (Bulgaria) players
Serie B players
Saudi Professional League players
Algerian expatriate footballers
Expatriate footballers in Bulgaria
Algerian expatriate sportspeople in Bulgaria
Expatriate footballers in Romania
Expatriate footballers in Italy
Algerian expatriate sportspeople in Italy
Expatriate footballers in Saudi Arabia
Algerian expatriate sportspeople in Saudi Arabia
Association football midfielders
Footballers from Marseille
French sportspeople of Algerian descent